Hiroshi Ishii (3 June 1941 – 27 December 2006) was a Japanese professional golfer.

Ishii played on the Japan Golf Tour, winning seven times.

Professional wins (10)

Japan Golf Tour wins (7)
1973 Chubu Open, Bridgestone Tournament
1975 Kansai Pro Championship
1977 Chubu Open
1978 Bridgestone Tournament
1979 Dunlop International Open (also Asia Golf Circuit event)
1984 Daikyo Open

Other wins (2)
1969 Japan PGA Championship
1971 All Nippon Doubles Tournament (with Shigeru Uchida)

Senior wins (1)
1991 Japan PGA Senior Championship

External links

Japanese male golfers
Japan Golf Tour golfers
Sportspeople from Shizuoka Prefecture
1941 births
2006 deaths